WWE Network is a subscription video on-demand over-the-top streaming service and digital television network owned by the American entertainment company WWE. It primarily distributes original professional wrestling events, films, television and documentary series, and a 24-hour linear channel produced by the eponymous professional wrestling promotion, alongside acquired programming from other wrestling promotions.

The service relied on technology developed by MLB Advanced Media and BAMTech, prior to Endeavor Streaming assuming technical operations of the service in 2019. Although operating primarily as a standalone service, the distribution model of the WWE Network varies by market, where it can be available as an integrated service through licensing agreements with third party providers, depending on the markets. The standalone service contains a premium and a free tier.

WWE Network was launched on February 24, 2014, in the United States, in Canada in July of that year, and expanded to the Asia-Pacific region and select European countries in August. The United Kingdom received the service in February 2015, and was made available in the Middle East and parts of Africa that March, and to India in November. It was launched in additional European and Asian countries in January 2016. Upon launch, the WWE Network was met with positive reception of its content library, but was criticized for technical problems. The service had 1.5 million subscribers by October 30, 2020. 
 
In 2021, NBCUniversal Television and Streaming acquired exclusive rights to distribute WWE Network in the United States, merging WWE content onto the premium tier of its own streaming service Peacock, and the standalone WWE Network was discontinued in the region that April. Similar distribution arrangements with streaming services in other territories have followed, discontinuing the standalone WWE network in Canada, MENA, India, Indonesia, Philippines, South Africa, and Australia.

History

Development and U.S. launch
The origins of the WWE Network can trace back to 2000 when USA Network filed a lawsuit against the World Wrestling Federation (WWF, known as WWE since 2002) due to a breach of contract which saw most of its programming moved to Viacom-owned TNN and MTV. The Delaware Chancery Court ruled in favor of the WWF in June 2000. Then CEO Linda McMahon revealed that WWF wanted its own cable network and testified that before WWF signed a rights deal with Viacom, the company had floated the idea of acquiring USA's Sci-Fi Channel, and reformatting it as a dedicated wrestling network. USA executives rejected the idea, and McMahon said that former USA Networks President Barry Baker encouraged her to talk to other programmers about potential deals. " 'I can tell you right now, Linda, you're not going to get anybody to give you a network,' " McMahon quoted Baker in her testimony. In 2005, USA Network re-acquired the rights to all WWE programming.

In September 2011, WWE officially announced plans to launch the WWE Network in 2012 as a pay-TV channel. WWE then conducted a survey asking people if they would pay for the WWE Network if it were a premium channel. In an email sent to WWE fans who might be interested in the WWE Network, WWE surveyed fans for their thoughts about the WWE Network airing WWE's pay-per-views to subscribers for no additional charge. The survey also noted that feature repeats of Raw and SmackDown, as well as footage from World Championship Wrestling (WCW), Extreme Championship Wrestling (ECW), National Wrestling Alliance (NWA), XFL, Smoky Mountain Wrestling (SMW), American Wrestling Association (AWA), and WWE films would also make the lineup. Original programming was also noted in the survey.

As the result of an online poll, WrestleMania Rewind was chosen as a name for a new WWE Network show on October 17, 2011. The original launch date was set for April 1, 2012, which would have coincided with WrestleMania XXVIII, and WWE's official website featured a countdown clock that would have expired on April 1. The clock was quietly removed, and the network did not launch as advertised. WWE chief marketing officer Michelle Wilson allayed fears about the future of the WWE Network, saying "There will be a WWE network in some shape or form. We are in late-stage negotiations with distributors", and confirmed that WWE Legends' House had been filmed. In April 2013, WWE had switched plans and aimed to release the WWE Network as a premium pay-TV outlet, with a potential price of $15 a month.

On Old School Raw in January 2014, WWE ran teasers promoting an announcement on January 8 at the Consumer Electronics Show in Las Vegas, later confirming that the announcement concerned the WWE Network. At the Consumer Electronics Show, WWE revealed a comprehensive plan which would see a launch date of February 24, 2014 in the United States. WWE Classics on Demand closed on January 31, 2014, to make way for the WWE Network. A free trial period was offered during the week of the launch. The logo initially used for the WWE Network eventually became the standard logo used by the WWE corporation in August 2014.

In April 2014, ahead of WrestleMania XXX, the Network received acclaim, with The New York Times saying that WWE had "positioned themselves on the cutting edge of Internet television." Later that month, the company announced that the network had 667,000 subscribers, short of the one million subscribers they needed to break even. As WWE's stock fell 50% the following month, Forbes described low subscription numbers as being of "additional concern" for investors after WWE's underwhelming NBCUniversal renewal deal. WWE offered a second free preview week of the WWE Network, which started July 7, in an attempt to sign new subscribers. A second report released at the end of July indicated that the network had reached 700,000 subscribers. WWE's goal was to reach one million subscribers by the end of 2014.

Expansion
On July 31, 2014, the company announced a 10-year, Canadian distribution deal for WWE content with Rogers Media (owner of Sportsnet 360, the historic carrier of WWE programming in Canada), which was to see the company distribute WWE Network as a premium television service. Also on that date, it was announced that the WWE Network would launch in Australia, New Zealand, Hong Kong, Singapore, Mexico, Spain, and the Nordics, among others on August 12, with Italian, Arab, German, Japanese, Indian, Chinese, Thai, and Malaysian launches planned for a later date. On October 30, 2014, in an attempt to increase subscription numbers from an announced figure of 731,000, the 6-month subscription requirement was dropped, allowing subscribers the option to cancel at any time. WWE had originally planned to launch the network on October 1 in the United Kingdom, but was delayed for a further month. The launch was confirmed to be taking place at 8 p.m. on November 3; however, 20 minutes prior to the launch, WWE announced that it had been indefinitely delayed. Vince McMahon publicly apologized for the delay. It was announced on January 4, 2015, that the WWE Network would be launching in the UK and Ireland on January 19, 2015, priced at £9.99 and €12.99, respectively, although some customers managed to register as early as January 13.

On January 27, 2015, WWE announced that the WWE Network had reached 1 million subscribers, with Vince McMahon saying that WWE would "remain focused on delivering an outstanding value proposition for ours fans by adding new content and new features in the coming year." On February 12, 2015, WWE announced a five-year partnership with television provider OSN to bring the WWE Network to the Middle East and North Africa as a premium service. On March 31, 2019, all OSN Sports channels were shut down and WWE content stopped airing on OSN services. A year later, WWE announced the Network content would be accessible in the MENA region directly through WWE services with no regional television provider or streaming service involved. Currently, and since March 23, 2022, Shahid holds exclusive rights to the Network content in the region.

On July 30, 2015, WWE revealed the number of subscribers for the Network at 1.156 million. This was announced as a part of WWE's financial reporting on the second quarter of the year, which had resulted in their stock price rising past $20.00 after closing on the previous day at $16.48. The total of 1.156 million paid subscribers marked a 13% decrease from the 1.315 million paid subscribers that was stated in the reports for the first quarter of 2015. WWE also revealed, including trial subscribers, they had 1.227 million Network users at the end of the second quarter, and over the entire lifespan of the Network, there have been over 2 million unique subscribers.

The WWE Network launched in India on November 2, 2015. On November 19, a report by market research and consulting firm Park Associates announced that the WWE Network had broken into the top five streaming services and trailed only MLB.tv in the sports category. WWE announced the network would launch in Germany, Switzerland, Austria, and Japan on January 5, 2016, followed by Thailand and the Philippines on February 29, 2016.

In April 2017, WWE announced a total of 1.949 million subscribers to the WWE Network, of which 1.661 million were paid subscribers. At the end of the third quarter of 2017, the number had dropped to 1.5 million paid users. In April 2018, WWE announced subscriber growth had reached 2.1 million, with 1.8 million paid. At the end of the third quarter of 2018 the number had dropped to 1.6 million paid users.

Switch to Endeavor, redesign 
In January 2019, WWE Network signed with Endeavor Streaming to replace BAMTech as its operating partner. WWE's decision was motivated by the acquisition of BAMTech by Disney. Co-president George Barrios cited concerns over how BAMTech's relationships with third-party partners would be impacted by the sale, while WWE also sought greater control over the service and its operations, intending to partner with another vendor or take the service entirely in-house. The company decided to partner with Endeavor Streaming (formed primarily from the assets of NeuLion) to provide infrastructure and billing services, and Massive Interactive to develop a new front-end and mobile apps.

The new WWE Network platform launched in July 2019, ahead of SummerSlam. It includes a revamped user experience, support for 1080p streams, new browsing tools (such as a new "Superstars" interface for filtering content by performers), and plans to add a download feature for offline viewing in the future. Support for PlayStation 3, Xbox 360, and selected legacy smart TVs was discontinued with the changeover. In an interview with The Verge, Barrios revealed that there were ongoing plans for WWE.com's existing video content to be integrated into the WWE Network platform as a "free" tier (possibly also including previews of WWE Network's premium content), and that WWE was also considering the development of a premium tier with additional features (such as benefits for other WWE operations).

In March 2020, amid the onset of the COVID-19 pandemic and to promote WrestleMania 36, WWE Network made a selection of its premium content and archives available free for a limited time. On June 1, 2020, WWE Network officially launched a free tier with 15,000 hours of content, which includes access to selected content such as recent episodes of its weekly programming, and original series such as Raw Talk, Monday Night War, and Ride Along. The service would be advertising-free, and was intended primarily to promote its weekly programs and pay-per-view events.

Merger of U.S. service into Peacock, other streaming deals 

On January 25, 2021, WWE announced that NBCUniversal Television and Streaming had acquired the exclusive U.S. distribution rights to WWE Network, and that the service would be folded into the NBCUniversal-owned streaming service Peacock on March 18, 2021 (ahead of Fastlane and WrestleMania 37). Existing and future WWE Network content will be hosted by a branded channel within the Peacock service, with the full service included as part of the paid Peacock Premium tier (which features a wider array of television, film, and sports programming), and a selection of WWE Network content (including some of its original series such as The Bump and Raw Talk, and episodes of Total Divas and Total Bellas from NBCUniversal cable channel E!) available within its free tier. WWE committed to produce a "signature documentary" for the service annually beginning in 2022.

After a transitional period, the standalone WWE Network ceased operations in the United States on April 4, 2021. To coincide with the introduction, Peacock announced plans to offer a four-month half-price promotion for new Premium subscribers. Not all content was available at launch, as the service's library was being audited to meet NBCUniversal standards and practices. WWE stated that the content migration would be completed by August 2021. This has included the removal of scenes/matches containing content inappropriate under current standards, with the most prominent example being a WrestleMania VI match where Roddy Piper painted half of his body black before facing African-American opponent Bad News Brown.

This agreement did not initially affect the WWE Network service outside of the United States, which continues to be marketed as a standalone offering through either WWE or its local partners. However, in 2022 WWE began to reach additional agreements to merge WWE Network into streaming services in other territories; in January 2022, WWE partnered with Disney+ Hotstar in Indonesia. In September 2022, it reached a similar agreement with Australian streaming service Binge as an extension of an existing agreement with owner Foxtel. In October 2022, WWE announced that it would carry WWE Network programming on Disney+ in the Philippines upon the service's launch on November 17, covering pay-per-views and library content (rights to WWE weekly television programs are owned by Cignal and TAP Sports).

Availability

The WWE Network is currently available through 186 out of 193 United Nations member states (including all 27 European Union nations) and two observer states such as the Holy See and the State of Palestine. It is also distributed through six non-UN countries: the Republic of China (Taiwan), the Cook Islands, Kosovo, Niue, Northern Cyprus, and SADR-claimed Western Sahara.

In late 2017, Liechtenstein and China were added to the list of non-available countries, however, the WWE Network is still available in the Chinese special administrative regions of Hong Kong and Macau as well as ROC-controlled Taiwan and Fujian. Since January 2021, WWE Network is available in India as an add-on subscription through the SonyLIV streaming service.

In December 2019, WWE renewed its agreements in Sub-Saharan Africa with SuperSport, adding a WWE-branded channel to DStv carrying WWE programs and WWE Network original series.

On January 27, 2022, it was announced that WWE Network would be available on Disney+ Hotstar in Indonesia at no additional costs to subscribers.

Amidst the ongoing invasion of Ukraine by the Russian military, WWE announced on March 3, 2022, that it had terminated the broadcasting relationship with Russia and shut down the WWE Network in the country, in line with the global sanctions imposed by the United States. The WWE Network service is also not available in the Russian-controlled regions of Crimea, Donetsk, Kherson, Luhansk, Zaporozhye, Transnistria, Abkhazia and South Ossetia.

On September 28, 2022, WWE announced an agreement with its Australian rightsholder Foxtel, which will see WWE Network merged into its streaming service Binge beginning in January 2023, with a launch later set for January 23, 2023. As part of the agreement, Foxtel's channel Fox8 will continue to carry WWE programming, and Foxtel will also introduce a new, WWE-branded linear channel. On October 20, 2022, it was announced that the WWE Network will move to Disney+ in the Philippines upon its launch on November 17, 2022.

Programming

Original programming

WWE events
 All WWE premium live events/pay-per-views.
 All WWE Network exclusive events.
 Pre-shows for pay-per-views and WWE Network exclusive events.
 NXT Level Up – An in-ring program featuring talent from the NXT developmental brand.
 Main Event – An in-ring program featuring talent from the Raw brand. Episodes air with three weeks of delay (original broadcast continues to air on Hulu).

Current shows
 First Look – A first look at upcoming WWE Home Video releases.
 This Week in WWE – A weekly 30-minute recap of the past week's WWE programs, hosted by Scott Stanford and Alyse Zwick (using the stage name "Alyse Ashton").
 WWE Ride Along – A show following WWE personalities as they drive from city to city.
 WWE Raw Talk – A weekly post-show for WWE Raw, hosted by Kevin Patrick and R-Truth.
 WWE Talking Smack - A weekly Saturday morning post-show for WWE SmackDown, hosted by Kayla Braxton and Paul Heyman.
 WWE Breaking News – Breaking news from WWE.
 Table for 3 – Three WWE personalities share stories over dinner.
 WWE Original Specials – A series of specials on the WWE Network. 
 WWE Beyond the Ring – Documentary portions of previously released WWE DVDs featuring various performers, organizations, and storylines.
 WWE 24 – A documentary show that goes behind the scenes of WWE events and personnel.
 WWE 365 – A documentary series that reviews a year in the career of a WWE talent.
 WWE Music Power 10 – A top 10 WWE Music countdown show.
 WWE Photo Shoot – A show where current and former WWE personnel sit down to explain the stories behind photos of their careers and lives. Also airs on YouTube.
 WWE The Day Of – A documentary series that catch a glimpse of WWE Superstars' lives as they prepare mentally and physically for their biggest matches. Also airs on YouTube.
 WWE Chronicle – A documentary series that chronicles a WWE personality and their journey through personal interviews and candid moments. Also airs on YouTube.
 WWE Collections Spotlight – A preview show that offers a sampling of exclusive WWE Collections that are available on the WWE Network.
 WWE Marquee Matches – Prominent matches in WWE history are showcased.
 Superstar Picks – WWE wrestlers present their favorite matches in their entirety.
 WWE Untold – Wrestlers reveal stories about moments in WWE history.
 WWE Watch Along – Pat McAfee interviews guests while watching various pay-per-views.
 Steve Austin's Broken Skull Sessions – Stone Cold Steve Austin interviews WWE Superstars and legends. 
 WWE Break It Down – The stories behind some of the biggest matches and moments in WWE history are discussed by the Superstars and legends who lived them.
 WWE Ruthless Aggression - The WWE Ruthless Aggression docuseries picks up where WWE Network's Monday Night War series left off, detailing the years that followed the Attitude Era, after WWE absorbed its-then top rival, WCW.
 Notsam Wrestling
 WWE Icons – A documentary series that is poised to be cover a number of top legends and Hall of Famers.
 WWE Evil – A documentary series that chronicles the minds of the most diabolical antagonists in WWE history and their impact on mainstream culture. (Peacock/US exclusive)
 WWE This is Awesome - A retrospective series that celebrates the awesome moments in WWE. Hosted by Greg Miller.

Former shows
 Holy Foley! – A reality TV show starring Mick Foley and his family.
 Jerry Springer Too Hot for TV – Jerry Springer hosts this look back at some of WWE's most outrageous and embarrassing moments.
 Unfiltered with Renee Young – Interview show hosted by Renee Young. Topics discussed include WWE wrestlers' wrestling careers and stories, music, and films.
 WWE Legends' House – A reality television series featuring several retired personnel.
 The Monday Night War: WWE vs. WCW – A television series about the Monday Night Wars.
 WWE Slam City – An animated series featuring current WWE talent, based on the Mattel toy line of the same name.
 The WWE List – A fast-paced, interactive series that tallies tweets from the WWE Universe to compile the most unusual lists ever in WWE history.
 WWE WrestleMania Rewind – The first show named to be part of the network; a retrospective look at WrestleMania's memorable moments.
 WWE Countdown – A top-10 countdown show based on interactive fan polls.
 WWE Rivalries – A show documenting rivalries in wrestling.
 Tough Talk – A post-show to Tough Enough hosted by Byron Saxton.
 Legends with JBL – An interview show hosted by John "Bradshaw" Layfield featuring WWE Legends and Hall of Famers.
 WWE Culture Shock – Corey Graves reveals a variety of unique venues, customs, music, food, and people as WWE's tour travels around the world.
 WWE Breaking Ground – A special look at the WWE Performance Center and what it takes to become a WWE wrestler.
 Stone Cold Podcast – Interview series hosted by Stone Cold Steve Austin.
 Live! With Chris Jericho – Interview series hosted by Chris Jericho.
 Swerved – A hidden camera prank show featuring WWE performers.
 Cruiserweight Classic – A thirty-two man tournament showcasing the cruiserweight division.
 Bring It to the Table – Peter Rosenberg hosts while Corey Graves and John "Bradshaw" Layfield debate controversial topics.
 WWE Superstar Ink – Corey Graves asks WWE wrestlers about the meaning behind their tattoos. Also airs on YouTube.
 Straight to the Source – An interview show hosted by Corey Graves.
 Something Else to Wrestle with Bruce Prichard – Interview show hosted by Bruce Prichard and Conrad Thompson.
 Elias: Unplugged
 Then and Now
 My Son/Daughter is a WWE Superstar
 WWE Game Night
 WWE Where Are They Now
 WWE NXT – A one-hour, in-ring program showcasing the NXT developmental brand, including periodic special live episodes. First-run editions of NXT moved to USA Network in an expanded live format in September 2019.
 The Edge and Christian Show – A comedy series and variety show starring Edge and Christian.
 Camp WWE – A short-form adult animation comedy series produced by Seth Green.
 Southpaw Regional Wrestling – A miniseries based on a fictional southern wrestling promotion set in the year 1987. Also airs on YouTube.
 Undertaker: The Last Ride - The unprecedented limited-series event chronicling over three years in the career of The Phenom.
 205 Live – A 30-minute (formerly 45-60 minute), in-ring program showcasing WWE's cruiserweight brand of the same name.
 Worlds Collide – An in-ring series, which will feature interbrand competition between WWE's five brands: Raw, SmackDown, 205 Live, NXT, and NXT UK.
 Mixed Match Challenge – A seasonal tournament featuring mixed tag team matches. Episodes air with two days of delay (original broadcast continues to air on Facebook Watch).
 Mae Young Classic – A seasonal tournament featuring thirty-two women wrestlers.
 NXT UK – A one-hour, in-ring program showcasing the NXT UK developmental brand.

Collections

WWE Network previously offered "WWE Collections", which are video packages of memorable characters and storylines. In July 2019, WWE updated the network and subsequently removed all collections.

Former Collections

 AJ Styles: Beyond Phenomenal
 Alexa Bliss: Five Feet Of Fury
 Andre the Giant
 Asuka: The Undefeated Empress
 Attitude Era: Stone Cold
 Batista Unleashed
 Becoming The Rock
 Becky Lynch: Straight Fire
 Best of Stone Cold vs. Mr. McMahon Part I 
 Best of Stone Cold vs. Mr. McMahon Part II
 Best of Stone Cold vs. Mr. McMahon Part III
 Bobby "The Brain" Heenan
 Bret vs Shawn: The Rivalry
 Curt Hawkins: Nothing To Lose
 Daniel Bryan's Greatest Moments
 Destruction of the Shield
 Dusty Rhodes: The American Dream
 DX: Are You Ready?
 Eddie Guerrero: Viva La Raza!
 Edge: You Think You Know Me?
 Finn Balor: Worldwide Sensation
 Goldberg: Who's Next?
 Hall of Fame: Class of 2018
 Hell in a Cell
  Jeff Jarrett: Ain't He Great
 Jim "The Anvil" Neidhart
 King Booker: All Hail!
 Kurt Angle: It's True, It's True
 Lesnar: The Road To The Undisputed Title
 Ladder Match: Reaching For Glory
 The Legacy of Shane McMahon
 Mean Gene Okerlund
 Mickie James: Crazy Sweetheart
 Million Dollar Man: Priceless
 Miz: The A-Lister
 Money in the Bank
 New to WWE Network (changes regularly)
 New Classic Content (changes monthly)
 The New Day: Feel The Positivity
 Nikolai Volkoff
 nWo: For Life
 Patterson 'N Brisco: The Stooges
 Piper's Pit: Born to Controversy
 Randy Savage: Cream of the Crop 
 Raw 25: 100–76
 Raw 25: 75–51
 Raw 25: 50–26
 Raw 25: 25–01
 Razor Ramon: Oozing Machismo
 Rey Mysterio: Biggest Little Man
 Ric Flair: Forever The Man
 Ric Flair: Stylin' and Profilin
 Rusev: Happy Rusev Day
 Sami Zayn: Never Be The Same
 Sammartino: The Legend Lives
 Sasha Banks: The Legit Boss
 Shawn Michaels: Heartbreak Kid
 Shawn Michaels: Mr. Wrestlemania
 Shinsuke Nakamura: The Rock Star
 Stephanie McMahon: All Business
 Sting: The Icon Defined
 The Bar: Sheamus and Cesaro
 The Brothers of Destruction
 The Collection of Jericho
 The Four Horsewomen of NXT 
 The Godfather: All Aboard
 The Hardys: Team Xtreme
 The Man They Call Vader
 The NXT Takeover Collection
 The Rise of John Cena
 The Royal Rumble Match
 The Undertaker vs Triple H Collection
 The WarGames Collection
 Three Faces of Foley
 TLC Tag Teams
 Tribute to the Troops
 Trish and Lita: Evolutionary
 Trish Stratus: Stay Stratusfied
 Undertaker: Dawn Of The Deadman
 Women's Evolution
 WWE Match of the Year 2017
 WWE Match of the Year 2018
 WrestleMania Monday
 Wrestlemania Theater
 Chyna: Ninth Wonder of the World
 Best of Swerved Season One
 The Canadian Collection
 Dolph Ziggler vs. The Miz (removed December 2017)
 Hall of Fame: Class of 2017
 WrestleMania Show Stealers
 Subscriber's Choice (changed quarterly, removed September 2017)
 George 'The Animal' Steele (removed October 2017)
 The Incomparable Mr. Fuji (removed October 2017)
 Jimmy Snuka: The Superfly (removed October 2017)
 The Cruiserweight Anthology (removed December 2017)
 Gravest Matches Ever (removed December 2017)
 Randy Orton: Apex Predator (removed December 2017)
 ECW Barely Legal Revisited (removed January 2018)
 Colorful Characters (removed February 2018)
 Greatest Matches Ever (removed February 2018)
 Celebrating Black History (removed March 2018)
 WWE Flashback Friday (changes weekly) (removed May 2018)
 Best of WWE Network (removed March 2019)
 WWE Shorts (removed March 2019)
 WWE Hidden Gems (moved to Vault section)

Repeat/archival programming 

In addition to previous editions of the original programs listed above, the network includes many other previously aired events.

Although the United States parental guidelines rating system rates most weekly WWE television programs TV-PG, the WWE Network broadcasts a wider range of content. A parental controls block is available and content rated TV-14 and TV-MA are preceded by an advisory warning. The network airs footage featuring Chris Benoit; it marks the first major airing of Benoit footage or even mention of Benoit in said footage since his murder-suicide in 2007. However, the Benoit tribute episode of Raw is replaced with the episode that aired internationally, a recap of championship matches. Also, Vengeance: Night of Champions in 2007 removes all references to Benoit during the ECW World Championship match. Over the Edge 1999, infamous for Owen Hart's death at the event, is also available for the first time since its original air date; however, some portions of the event have been edited out of respect to the Hart family. Matches called with Jesse Ventura on commentary, which had previously been dubbed over due to a 1991 lawsuit, are available with the original commentary.

While the network promoted on-demand airings as being unedited, some instances of expletives, gestures, and all nudity are censored. Many programs were digitized for WWE 24/7 prior to the 2012 settlement with the World Wide Fund for Nature, and thus the "WWF" and the "WWF scratch" logo are censored in some instances. Some original music has been dubbed over with alternate tracks such as the original intro music to Saturday Night's Main Event (May 1985 – January 1988 episodes) which originally played "Obsession" by Animotion.

At launch, all but one of New Jack's matches were removed from ECW pay-per-views, as was his surprise return at Heat Wave 1998, due to a combination of musical rights issues over his entrance music and the inability to remove the music without losing the original commentary audio. The deleted matches were eventually reinstated with replacement music and newly recorded Joey Styles commentary. Several pay-per-views are copies of their condensed home video releases, rather than the live versions, and so are missing matches.

Archive content on the Peacock-hosted version of WWE Network is being further edited for content by NBCUniversal. On launch, two pay-per-views were edited to remove racially-insensitive content; WrestleMania VI was edited to remove a match between Roddy Piper and Bad News Brown where Piper had painted half of his body black, and Survivor Series 2005 was edited to remove a backstage segment where Vince McMahon used a racial slur in front of Booker T and John Cena.

Pay-per-views
Almost every WWF/WWE, JCP/WCW, and ECW pay-per-view (PPV) event ever produced is available for on-demand streaming. Although WWE promotes the selection as every pay-per-view ever made, a handful of PPV events have not yet been made available. This includes mostly foreign events such as WCW's Millennium Final, Collision in Korea, and the Japan Supershows, and ECW's foreign ECW/FMW Supershows, however it also includes some events held domestically such as WCW's Nitro Girls Swimsuit Calendar Special and When Worlds Collide, and WWF's No Holds Barred: The Match/The Movie.

In addition the pay-per-view section contains several events which did not air on pay-per-view, such as WWE events Royal Rumble 1988 and WWE Global Warning Tour: Melbourne. Many ECW Supercards are also listed as pay-per-views, despite never actually airing there.

WWF/WWE home video
The WWE released videos under the header "Home video classics" which include various previous home video releases that had been originally released under Coliseum Video.

Andre The Giant
Bashed in the USA
Battle Royal at the Albert Hall
Big, Small, Strange, Strong
Big Daddy Cool Diesel
Bloopers, Bleeps, and Bodyslams
Brains Behind the Brawn
Bret Hart: Greatest Matches
Bret "The Hitman" Hart
British Bulldog Davey Boy Smith
The British Bulldogs
Bruno Sammartino: Living Legend
Brutus The Barber Beefcake
Crunch Classic
Demolition
Euro Rampage '92
Funniest Moments
George 'The Animal' Steele
German Fan Favorites
Global Warfare
Global Warning Tour: Melbourne
Grand Slams
Greatest Hits
Grudge Match '86
'Hacksaw' Jim Duggan
The Hart Foundation
Hottest Matches
Hulk Hogan: Real American
The Hulkster Hulk Hogan
Inside the Steel Cage
Invasion '92
Invasion of the Bodyslammers
Jake The Snake Roberts
The Ken Patera Story
Life and Times: Capt. Lou Albano
Macho Madness
Macho Man and Elizabeth
Mega Matches
Most Embarrassing Moments
Paul Bearer Hits From the Crypt
Rampage '91
Rampage '92
Razor Ramon
Ricky "The Dragon" Steamboat
Roddy Pipers Greatest Hits
Smack’Em Whack’Em
Shawn Michaels
Sunny
SuperTape '92
SuperTape II
SuperTape III
SuperTape IV
SuperTape
UK Fan Favorites 1993
UK Rampage '93
The Ultimate Warrior 1989
The Ultimate Warrior 1992
The Undertaker Buries Them Alive
The Undertaker The Face of Fear
Unusual Matches
Villains of the Squared Circle
World Tour '90
World Tour '91
World Tour '92
WrestleFest '90
WrestleFest '91
WrestleFest '92
WrestleFest '93
Wrestling Superheroes
Wrestling Tough Guys
Wrestling's Greatest Champions

WWWF/WWF/WWE programming
 Every episode of WWE Raw (except the episodes aired in the last 31 days)
 Every episode of WWE SmackDown (except the episodes aired in the last 31 days)
 Every episode of WWE NXT (except the episodes aired in the last 24 hours)
 Every episode of NXT UK 
 Every episode of WWE Main Event (except the episodes aired in the last 16 days)
 Every episode of WWE Tribute to the Troops
 Every WWE Hall of Fame induction ceremony (Clips from 1994 to 1996, full event 2004–present)
 Every episode of WWE Mixed Match Challenge
 Every episode of Saturday Night's Main Event and The Main Event
 Every episode of Tuesday Night Titans with the exception of episode 31
 Every episode of ECW
 Every episode of WWE Legends of Wrestling
 Select episodes of WWF Championship Wrestling from 1980
 Select episodes of WWE Superstars from 2014 to 2016
 Select episodes of WWF Superstars from 1992 to 1996
 Select episodes of WWF Wrestling Challenge from 1986 to 1987 
 Select episodes of Prime Time Wrestling from 1986, 1990–1992; all from 1987 to 1989
 Select episodes of WWE Old School, archival house shows typically from Madison Square Garden and Boston Garden from 1973, 1975–1988, 1990–1991 and 1997.
 Select episodes of All-Star Wrestling from 1975 to 1982
 Select episodes of Heat from 1998 to 1999 (all 1998; January–July 1999)
 Select episodes of WWE Confidential all from 2002, select from 2003 to 2004
 Select episodes of WWE Velocity from 2002 to 2004.

JCP/WCW programming
 Every episode of Clash of the Champions
 Every episode of WCW Monday Nitro
 Every episode of WCW Thunder
 Select episodes of Mid-Atlantic Championship Wrestling from 1981 to 1986 (204 episodes)
 Select episodes of WCW Saturday Night all from 1986 to 1988, select from 1985, 1989, 1992–1994

ECW programming
 Every episode of ECW Hardcore TV
 Every episode of ECW Wrestling

Other promotions
 Select episodes of AWA Championship Wrestling from 1983, 1986–1988
 Select episodes of Global Wrestling Federation from 1990 to 1992
 Select episodes of Mid-South Wrestling all from 1983, select from 1981 to 1982, 1984–1986
 Select episodes of Smoky Mountain Wrestling from 1994
 Select episodes of World Class Championship Wrestling from 1982 to 1988 (339 of 397) total

Non-wrestling content
 Every episode of Tough Enough
 Every episode of seasons 1–9 of Total Divas
 Every episode of seasons 1–6 of Total Bellas
 Every episode of seasons 1–3 of Miz & Mrs
 E! libraries
Additional content from WWE Libraries, which has a library of over 100,000 hours of programming, will be added over time.

Independent wrestling content 

 Evolve (acquired in 2020, select events available)
 Progress Wrestling (first-run from Chapter 104 to 129, plus select chapters beforehand and chapters thereafter either first- or second-run, delayed from DemandPROGRESS releases)
 Insane Championship Wrestling
Fight Club (select episodes from 2018 and first-run episodes from November 2020 onwards)
Select marquee events such as Shug's Hoose Party 5 and Fear and Loathing XI, with post-pandemic marquee events going first-run from Fear and Loathing XII onwards
 Westside Xtreme Wrestling
Shotgun 2020 (Season 2)
We Love Wrestling (delayed from original wXwNOW releases)
Select PPV/marquee events (delayed from original wXwNOW releases)

Removed content 
 Hulk Hogan's Rock 'n' Wrestling (Removed after controversial racial statements previously made by Hogan were made public.)
 Stampede Wrestling (Removed after rights dispute with Bret Hart.)
 As Seen on YouTube – The best of WWE's YouTube content.
 WWE Quick Hits – A monthly show with extra short clips from various DVDs & WWE Network shows.

Impact on pay-per-view industry 
In an interview with Time, Michelle D. Wilson, chief revenue and marketing officer for WWE, stated their reason for bypassing cable companies and instead only offering the WWE Network online: "Digital over-the-top offerings represent the future, and given that our passionate fans consume five times more online video content than non-WWE viewers and over-index for purchasing online subscriptions such as Netflix and Hulu, we believe the time is now for a WWE Network."

In response to the announcement, DirecTV issued a statement saying that they are re-evaluating whether to continue carrying WWE's pay-per-view events. Due to the fact that these events would also be available on the WWE Network once it launches, it might reduce the number of pay-per-view purchases via cable and satellite providers. Vince McMahon suggested that pay-TV operators would ultimately decide to continue to carry WWE's pay-per-view events, given that providers keep a significant share of each purchase, and incur minimal costs (apart from WWE's share of the fee for each purchase) to carry the events: "It's found money for them." DirecTV later quietly dropped carriage of WWE PPVs. In response, WWE said, "Yes, DIRECTV has decided to stop offering our PPV's residentially and commercially. The only other option would be to work through the local cable provider."

On February 19, 2014, Dish Network announced that they would carry WWE pay-per-views on an event by event basis, beginning with Elimination Chamber. Dish Network later released a statement saying, "Dish will not offer the ‘WWE Elimination Chamber’ PPV on 2/23. WWE is not willing to adjust their PPV costs to satellite and cable companies, which is unfair to their customers. We need to re-focus our efforts to support partners that better serve Dish customers." Dish later made a decision to air WrestleMania XXX. Dish declined to offer WrestleMania 31 and 32 but did offer WrestleMania 33 in 2017.

Advertising 
In October 2014, it was reported Mattel, Kmart, and Pepsi would begin advertising on the network starting the week of October 13. Wilson stated that although no commercial breaks will occur during scheduled programming, 30 second adverts would run in between shows, and that one 15 or 30-second advert would be shown prior to every fourth stream of on-demand content.

Notes

References

External links 
 

 
Internet television channels
WWE
Internet properties established in 2014
2014 establishments in Connecticut
Subscription video streaming services
Professional wrestling streaming services
PlayStation 4 software
Companies based in Stamford, Connecticut